The 2020 season was Sunrisers' first season, in which they competed in the 50 over Rachael Heyhoe Flint Trophy following reforms to the structure of women's domestic cricket in England. The side finished bottom of the North Group of the competition, losing all six of their matches.

After the ending of the Women's Cricket Super League in 2019, the ECB announced the beginning of a new "women's elite domestic structure". Eight teams were included in this new structure, with Sunrisers being one of the new teams, representing the London and the East of England. Due to the impact of the COVID-19 pandemic, only the Rachael Heyhoe Flint Trophy was able to take place. Sunrisers were captained by Amara Carr and coached by Trevor Griffin, and played their home matches at the County Ground, Chelmsford.

Squad
Sunrisers' squad is listed below. Age given is at the start of Sunrisers' first match of the season (29 August 2020).

Rachael Heyhoe Flint Trophy

South Group

 Advanced to the Final.

Fixtures

Statistics

Batting

Bowling

Fielding

Wicket-keeping

References

Sunrisers (women's cricket) seasons
2020 in English women's cricket